An-Naml  is the 27th chapter (sūrah) of the holy Qur'an with 93 verses (āyāt).

Regarding the timing and contextual background of the supposed revelation (asbāb al-nuzūl), it is an earlier "Meccan surah", which means it is believed to have been revealed in Mecca, rather than later in Medina.

Summary 
1-3 The Quran is a direction of good tidings to the faithful
4-5 Unbelievers are losers here and hereafter
6 The Quran certainly given by God to Muhammad
7-12 The story of Moses at the burning bush
13-14 Moses rejected by Pharaoh and the Egyptians as an impostor
15 David and Solomon praise God for their wisdom
16-17 Solomon’s dominion over Djinn, men, and birds
18-19 The wise ant pleases Solomon
20-44 The story of the Queen of Sheba and her conversion to Islam
45-48 Thamúd rejects Sálih their prophet
49-51 Nine men plot the destruction of Sálih and his family
52-54 The Thamúdites and their plotters destroyed, but Sálih and his followers are saved
55-59 The story of Lot and the destruction of Sodom
60-68 God, the creator and preserver, more worthy of praise than false gods
69-70 The unbelievers scoff at the warnings of Muhammad
71-72 They shall certainly be destroyed as were those who rejected the prophets of old
73-77 Judgment on the wicked delayed through the mercy of God
78-80 The Qurán decides the points of controversy among the children of Israel
81 Muhammad comforted by the assurance of his integrity
82-83 Reprobate infidels blind to the error of their ways
84-90 Signs of judgment and doom of unbelievers
91 The righteous secure from the terror of judgment
92 The wicked shall be punished
93-94 Muhammad commanded to worship God, to be a Muslim, and to proclaim the Qurán
95 God will show his signs to true believers

Sura 27 tells stories of the prophets Musa (Moses), Sulayman (Solomon), Saleh, and Lut (Lot) to emphasize the message of tawhid (monotheism) in Arabian and Israelite prophets. The miracles of Moses, described in the Book of Exodus, are mentioned in opposition to the arrogance and kufr (disbelief) of the Pharaoh.

The story of Solomon is most detailed: Solomon converted Queen Bilqis of Saba' (Sheba) to the "true religion" after a hoopoe reported to him that she was a sun-worshipping queen. This sura was likely revealed to address the role of the "Children of Israel" among the believers in Mecca, to emphasize and commend the piety of past prophets, and to distinguish the present Qur'anic message from past traditions.

Significance of title 
The sura's name is taken from the ants whose conversations were understood by Solomon. Similar to Sura 13 (The Thunder) or Sura 29 (The Spider), The Ants has no thematic significance in the Sura beyond it being a familiar phrase amongst believers, a reminder of the sura's story of Solomon.

Ants do hold a privileged status among animals in Islam on account of the story of Solomon. Hadith literature tells of Muhammad forbidding Muslims to kill the ant, bee, hoopoe, or shrike; it is no coincidence that they are all featured in Sura 27 and that Sura 16 is entitled The Bee. One interpretation for the ant's theological significance coincides with its role historically. As written in the 1993 edition of the Encyclopaedia of Islam, "Since early antiquity, ants have been an object of admiration on account of ... the feverish activity with which they provide for their 27th chapter (surah) of the Qur'an with 93 verses (ayat) sustenance and the perfect organisation of their societies." This perfect organization under one cause correlates well with the Islamic idea of obedience, or ibadah.

Main concepts 

 Tawhid was preached by many Israelite prophets as well as Arabian prophets prior to Qur'anic revelation.
 "Truly, this Qur'an explains to the Children of Israel most of what they differ about, and it is guidance and grace for those who believe."
 God has no equal as a creator; all those who associate others with God are guilty of shirk.
 Earthly knowledge is nothing compared to God; only those with open ears and eyes will turn to God.
 Disbelievers of the message of God will have no hope come Judgement Day.
 The revelation is a clear warning. Sura 27 reiterates that all humanity must turn to God without delay.

Chronology 
Sura 27 is agreed to be a Meccan Sura from the middle of the Meccan period. Tafsīr al-Jalālayn notes that some exceptions exist: ayat 52-55 are from the Medinan period; aya 85 was revealed during the Hijra to Medina.

Nöldeke's Chronology 
Orientalist Theodor Nöldeke's chronology places Sura 27 as 68th out of 114. He places it amongst the 21 suras of the Second Meccan Period (See Muhammad in Mecca). (The Meccan period is estimated to be from 610-622 CE.) Nöldeke estimates Sura 27 to be preceded by Sura 17 Al-Isra and followed by Sura 18 al-Kahf. All three suras use allusions to Judaism and the stories of Moses in particular.

Egyptian Chronology 
Standard Islamic Egyptian chronology places Sura 27 as 48th out of 114. In this order, it comes before Sura 28 al-Qasas and after Sura 26 al-Shu'ara, following its order in the standard 'Uthmanic Qur'an (see History of the Qur'an). Amongst all three suras and all suras numbered between 19 and 32, the account of revelation begins with "mysterious letters," the meaning of which is speculated among some and among others remains unknown; they are speculated to have been variant Arabic dialects. Sura 27 begins with the words "Ta Sin." As evident in Tafsīr al-Jalālayn, these words are sometimes interpreted as mysteries of God – signs to believe.

Structure 
Sura 27, as a mid-Meccan Period sura, can be interpreted multiple ways in terms of structure. Thematically speaking, the sura progresses across several subjects:
 Declaration of Qur'an – (In Sura 27:1, the Qur'an refers to itself consciously as a scripture, meant to make all clear.)
 Moses's Signs are ignored by the Pharaoh
 Solomon realizes God's blessings and dedicates himself to God's service.
 The Queen of Sheba deals well with Solomon and acts generously with him.
 The Queen of Sheba, one from disbelievers, converts and devotes herself to tawhid.
 The people of Thamud disregard the warnings of Salih; Lot is likewise rejected by his people. The disbelievers are thus destroyed for scheming.
 Declaration of God's universality, omniscience, and omnipotence – The Sura's phrasing condemns forgetting God's omnipotence.
 Declaration of Abandonment of Disbelievers – Prophet is to wash his hands of them.
 Foretelling of Judgement (see Islamic view of the Last Judgment) and Indication of Signs.
 Reiteration of Qur'an's purpose as a Warning.

Straight-forward interpretation 
According to a chronological reading of the text, the Sura ends on a bold note of warning. This is a perfectly valid reading of the text. Tafsīr al-Jalālayn concurs with this reading, suggesting in reference to ayat 91-93 that the prophet's duty is only to warn; the powerful, imminent tone expressed supports the conclusion that the final point of the Sura is the focal point.

Ring structure 
Another valid reading of the text utilizes ring structure (see Chiastic structure). Favored in prominent modern scholar of Qur'anic studies Carl Ernst's interpretations of certain middle to late Meccan period suras, it can be applied to Sura 27 as well. In ring structure, the focal point of the piece is found in the center, surrounded front and back by parallel statements. (Such parallel statements could elaborate on one another, contrast each other, or affirm one another. Multiple interpretations exist.) One could interpret Sura 27 as follows:

 1. Declaration of Qur'an through a reiterative warning of its purpose.
 2. Moses's signs are ignored by Pharaoh.
 3. An indication of signs with a foretelling of judgement.
 4. Solomon, realizing God’s blessings, dedicates himself as a Believer.
 5. The Queen of Sheba is generous with Solomon, and deals well with him. She converts from disbelief, then devotes herself to tawhid.
 6. After rejecting their prophets, God destroys the Sodomites, and the people of Thamud, leading to a general declaration of abandonment for disbelievers.
 7. The conclusive interpretation from ring structure: A rebuke of disbelief through a declaration of God's omnipotence, omnipresence, and omniscience.

References

External links 
Quran 27 | Clear Quran translation

Q27:2, 50+ translations, islamawakened.com

Naml
Ants
Solomon
Lot (biblical person)